Zipporah Szold (née Falk, 1888–1979) was the fourth president of the Hadassah Women's Zionist Organization of America, serving from 1928 to 1930.

Background
Zipporah Falk was born in Savannah, Georgia, in 1888. She studied at Bryn Mawr College and graduated in 1909.

Career

Szold's achievements during her time as Hadassah president included fundraising for the Hadassah Hospital on Mount Scopus in Jerusalem and working to increase awareness related to Palestine at the time. She also edited the Hadassah Newsletter and served as the United Nations chairwoman for the organization.

Personal life and death

Zip Falk married Robert Szold, Henrietta Szold's cousin and president of the Zionist Organization of America.  Robert Szold was also a partner in Lowenthal, Szold and Brandwen of 43 Exchange Place, New York City.

Szold died 1979 in New York City at the age of 91.

See also

 Robert Szold
 Henrietta Szold
 Benjamin Szold

References

External links 

 Zip Szold's records in the Executive Functions Records in the Hadassah Archives on permanent loan at the American Jewish Historical Society in New York, NY
 Szold is mentioned in Nazism, the Jews, and American Zionism, 1933-1948 and Letters of Louis D. Brandeis: Volume V, 1921-1941: Elder Statesman, Volume 5 

Bryn Mawr College alumni
People from Savannah, Georgia
Zionist activists
Hadassah Women's Zionist Organization of America members
1888 births
1979 deaths